Dallas Lynn Patterson (born 30 May 1947) is a former Australian rules footballer who played with Footscray in the Victorian Football League (VFL).

Notes

External links 

Dallas Patterson's playing statistics from The VFA Project

Living people
1947 births
Australian rules footballers from Victoria (Australia)
Western Bulldogs players
Williamstown Football Club players
Dandenong Football Club players